Before Love Came to Kill Us is the debut studio album by Canadian singer-songwriter Jessie Reyez. It was released on March 27, 2020, by FMLY and Island Records. The record was prefaced with the singles "Figures", "Imported" with 6lack, and "Love in the Dark", and the promotional single "Ankles". A deluxe edition with three additional songs was made available digitally on April 9, 2020. A super deluxe edition of the album was released on September 25, 2020.

Critical reception 

Before Love Came to Kill Us was met with widespread critical acclaim. At Metacritic, which assigns a normalised rating out of 100 to reviews from mainstream critics, the album received an average score of 82, based on nine reviews.

For AllMusic, Andy Kellman wrote that "Although it's all over the place, Before Love Came to Kill Us radiates conviction from front to back, and is without doubt a true representation of its creator." Exclaim! Ryan B. Patrick affirms that the album "has been built to last" and is "one of the better albums in an already interesting 2020." Rhian Daly of NME called it "heart-stoppingly good" and a "beautiful, heart-wrenching debut that sees its creator come good on her early promise." Writing for Clash, Narzra Ahmed complimented Reyez's versatility and adjectived the album "an excellent debut". Kathryn St. Asaph of Pitchfork pointed out that the album's genre range works in a "satisfying" way "not because she whizzes across multiple genres, but because of the skill she displays at each". The singer's uniqueness was praised by The Guardian Kitty Empire, who labeled the tracks as "largely excellent".

The album was shortlisted for the 2020 Polaris Music Prize, and for the Juno Award for Contemporary R&B/Soul Recording of the Year at the Juno Awards of 2021. For the Polaris Music Prize, which followed a unique format of commissioning filmmakers to make short films inspired by the shortlisted albums due to the COVID-19 pandemic in Canada preventing the staging of a traditional gala, the album's film was directed by Alicia K. Harris.

Track listing

Notes
  indicates an additional producer
  indicates a co-producer
  indicates a vocal producer
 The track's titles are stylized in all caps.

Charts

Release history

See also
List of 2020 albums

Notelist

References 

2020 debut albums
Jessie Reyez albums
Albums produced by Eminem
Island Records albums
Albums produced by Fred Ball (producer)
Albums produced by Rogét Chahayed